Megan Khang (born October 23, 1997) is an American professional golfer. She plays on the LPGA Tour and is the first player of Hmong and Laotian descent to do so.

Khang's parents were refugees from the Vietnam War from Laos and came to the United States with their respective families in the 1970s. Khang was born in Brockton, Massachusetts in 1997 and learned the sport from her father. She qualified for the 2012 U.S. Women's Open at the age of 14. She won several events as a junior golfer and played on the United States Junior Solheim Cup team in 2015.

Khang finished T-6 at the LPGA Final Qualifying Tournament in 2015 to earn her LPGA Tour card for the 2016 season. She has maintained her card ever since. Her best finish to date is second at the 2022 Dana Open, finishing a stroke behind winner Gaby López.

She was a member of the 2019 and 2021 United States Solheim Cup teams.

Personal life
Khang is good friends with actress Kathryn Newton as they were competing against each other at AJGA events when they were younger. Newton would play golf right up until graduating high school when she put sole focus on her acting career.

Amateur wins
2013 PING Invitational, Faldo Series Grand Final
2014 Faldo Series Grand Final, Doral-Publix Junior Classic
2015 Eastern Amateur Championship

Source:

Results in LPGA majors
Results not in chronological order before 2019.

LA = Low amateur
CUT = missed the half-way cut
NT = no tournament
"T" = tied

Summary

Most consecutive cuts made – 8 (2018 Evian – 2020 ANA)
Longest streak of top-10s – 3 (2020 U.S. Open – 2021 U.S. Open)

World ranking
Position in Women's World Golf Rankings at the end of each calendar year.

Team appearances
Amateur
Junior Solheim Cup (representing the United States): 2015 (winners)

Professional
Solheim Cup (representing the United States): 2019, 2021

Solheim Cup record

References

External links

American female golfers
LPGA Tour golfers
Golfers from Massachusetts
Sportspeople from Brockton, Massachusetts
American people of Hmong descent
American people of Laotian descent
1997 births
Living people
20th-century American women
21st-century American women